Eric Scott “Big Grits” Montross (born September 23, 1971) is an American former professional basketball player who played in the National Basketball Association (NBA) for eight seasons with the Boston Celtics, Dallas Mavericks, New Jersey Nets, Philadelphia 76ers, Detroit Pistons, and Toronto Raptors. Born in Indianapolis, he played for Lawrence North High School before enrolling at the University of North Carolina at Chapel Hill to play for the Tar Heels.

High school 
Playing for Lawrence North High School, he was selected as a McDonald's All American in 1990. That same year, he was named to the USA Today All-USA first Team. After leading Lawrence North to the Indiana high school basketball championship Montross committed himself to the North Carolina Tar Heels.

Montross was also a baseball pitcher in high school and was drafted by the Chicago Cubs with the 1,547th pick overall in the 1994 MLB draft.

College career 
He was part of the UNC team that won the NCAA Championship against Michigan in 1993 and was named an All-American as a junior and senior. Montross' father and grandfather had played for Michigan.  His father Scott was a teammate of Cazzie Russell in the 1960s and his maternal grandfather John Townsend was an All-American in the 1930s. In 4 seasons at UNC, Montross appeared in 139 games, averaging 11.7 points, 6.8 rebounds and 1.2 blocks per game.

Professional career
Montross was selected by the Boston Celtics with the ninth overall pick in the 1994 NBA draft.  During his first year in the NBA, he averaged 10 points per game, and was selected to the 1995 Rookie All-Star Game and named to the NBA All-Rookie 2nd Team. However, Montross would never again reach this level of production. The Celtics came under fire for selecting Montross over players such as Eddie Jones, Jalen Rose, and  Aaron McKie.  During his career in the NBA, Montross played with the Celtics, Dallas Mavericks, New Jersey Nets, Philadelphia 76ers, Detroit Pistons, and the Toronto Raptors.  Montross announced his retirement on August 26, 2003, due to a foot injury and was waived by the Raptors in February, 2004. During his career, Montross averaged 4.5 points, 4.6 rebounds, 0.6 blocks and 0.4 assists per game.  He played in 465 games and started 288.

Post basketball
Montross is now a color commentator on the Tar Heel Sports Network men's basketball broadcasts, having worked the position since former color analyst Mick Mixon left to become the play-by-play voice of the Carolina Panthers.

With the Pan-American Health Organization, Montross co-founded an organization called Vaccine Ambassadors, which aims to distribute vaccines all over the world, especially to developing countries, and help children.

In 1994, he started the Eric Montross Fathers Day Basketball Camp.  The camp has raised over one million dollars for the UNC Children's hospital.

Career statistics

College

Source

|-
| style="text-align:left;"| 1990–91
| style="text-align:left;"| North Carolina
| 35 || 9 || 15.2 || .587 || - || .612 || 4.2 || .3 || .2 || .9 || 5.8
|-
| style="text-align:left;"| 1991–92
| style="text-align:left;"| North Carolina
| 31 || 25 || 25.3 || .574 || - || .624 || 7 || .6 || .5 || 1 || 11.2
|-
| style="text-align:left;"| 1992–93
| style="text-align:left;"| North Carolina
| 38 || 36 || 28.3 || .615 || - || .684 || 7.6 || .7 || .6 || 1.2 || 15.8  
|-
| style="text-align:left;"| 1993–94
| style="text-align:left;"| North Carolina
| 35 || 35 || 31.7 || .560 || - || .558 || 8.1 || .8 || .5 || 1.8 || 13.6
|- class="sortbottom"
| style="text-align:center;" colspan="2"|  Career
| 139 || 105 || 25.2 || .585 || - || .624 || 6.8 || .6 || .5 || 1.2 || 11.7

NBA

Source

Regular season

|-
| style="text-align:left;"| 1994–95 
| style="text-align:left;"| Boston
|  78 || 75 || 29.7 || .534 || .000 || .635 || 7.3 || 0.5 || 0.4 || 0.8 || 10.0
|-
| style="text-align:left;"| 1995–96
| style="text-align:left;"| Boston
| 61 || 59 || 23.5 || .566 || - || .376 || 5.8 || 0.7 || 0.3 || 0.5 || 7.2
|-
| style="text-align:left;"| 1996–97
| style="text-align:left;"| Dallas/New Jersey
| 78 || 77 || 23.5 || .456 || - || .339 || 6.6 || 0.8 || 0.3 || 0.9 || 4.3
|-
| style="text-align:left;"| 1997–98
| style="text-align:left;"| Philadelphia/Detroit
| 48 || 30 || 14.4 || .424 || - || .400 || 4.1 || 0.2 || 0.3 || 0.6 || 2.9
|-
| style="text-align:left;"| 
| style="text-align:left;"| Detroit
| 46 || 2 || 12.5 || .525 || .000 || .344 || 3.0 || 0.3 || 0.3 || 0.6 || 2.1
|-
| style="text-align:left;"| 
| style="text-align:left;"| Detroit
| 51 || 0 || 6.5 || .309 || - || .500 || 1.4 || 0.1 || 0.1 || 0.2 || 0.8
|-
| style="text-align:left;"| 
| style="text-align:left;"| Detroit/Toronto
| 54 || 21 || 12.0 || .406 || - || .258 || 3.2 || 0.4 || 0.2 || 0.5 || 2.2
|-
| style="text-align:left;"| 
| style="text-align:left;"| Toronto
| 49 || 24 || 13.4 || .402 || .000 || .323 || 2.9 || 0.3 || 0.2 || 0.5 || 2.4
|- class="sortbottom"
| style="text-align:center;" colspan="2"| Career 
| 465 || 288 || 18.2 || .490 || .000 || .478 || 4.6 || 0.4 || 0.3 || 0.6 || 4.5

Notes

External links
Basketball-Reference stats

1971 births
Living people
All-American college men's basketball players
American expatriate basketball people in Canada
American men's basketball players
American people of Dutch descent
American people of French-Canadian descent
American radio sports announcers
Basketball players at the 1991 Pan American Games
Basketball players from Indianapolis
Boston Celtics draft picks
Boston Celtics players
Centers (basketball)
College basketball announcers in the United States
Dallas Mavericks players
Detroit Pistons players
McDonald's High School All-Americans
New Jersey Nets players
North Carolina Tar Heels men's basketball announcers
North Carolina Tar Heels men's basketball players
Pan American Games bronze medalists for the United States
Pan American Games medalists in basketball
Parade High School All-Americans (boys' basketball)
Philadelphia 76ers players
Toronto Raptors players
Medalists at the 1991 Pan American Games